The 1868 Lyttelton by-election was a by-election held on 2 November 1868 during the 4th New Zealand Parliament in the Canterbury electorate of .

The by-election was caused by the death of the incumbent MP George Macfarlan; he had been elected by the 1867 Lyttelton by-election.

The by-election was won by John Thomas Peacock. As there were no other candidates, he was declared duly elected.

Notes

Lyttelton 1868
1868 elections in New Zealand
Politics of Canterbury, New Zealand
November 1868 events